New Jalpaiguri Junction railway station (station code NJP) established in 1960, is an A1 category broad gauge and narrow-gauge railway station under Katihar railway division of Northeast Frontier Railway zone. It is the largest as well as the busiest railway junction of Northeast India. This junction is largest among the railway stations which serves the city of Siliguri, the largest metropolis of the North Bengal. New Jalpaiguri junction ranked 10th cleanest railway station in India in 2016 survey and came among the top 100 booking stations of Indian railway. New Jalpaiguri, as a railway station serves as the entry point to North Bengal, Sikkim, other countries like Nepal,  Bhutan, Bangladesh and the seven northeastern states (Assam, Arunachal Pradesh, Nagaland, Manipur, Mizoram, Tripura and Meghalaya). New Jalpaiguri Junction acts as a connecting base for the Northeastern states to the Indian mainland.

History
The partition of India in 1947 completely disrupted communication links in North Bengal and Assam with the southern parts of West Bengal. Earlier, the links were through the eastern part of Bengal, which became a part of Pakistan in 1947. Siliguri gained in importance as the gateway to North Bengal, Sikkim, Bhutan and Assam.

Around 1949, Siliguri Junction station, a new station north of the old Siliguri Town railway station, came up with several metre-gauge lines converging on it. In addition there was the narrow gauge Darjeeling Himalayan Railway running from Siliguri Town station to Darjeeling via Siliguri Junction. The Assam Rail Link Project, completed in 1950, linked the railways in Assam, with a metre-gauge line to Kishanganj. The line running across North Bengal, spanned the Teesta, Torsha, and Sankosh rivers.

In the early 1960s, Indian Railways started changing over from metre gauge to broad gauge and built a new  broad gauge station south of Siliguri Town station. Since the new station was located in Jalpaiguri district, it was named New Jalpaiguri. By 1964, New Jalpaiguri became the most important railway station in the area. It had both broad gauge (to Kishanganj and Barsoi, and to Siliguri town and Siliguri junction) and metre gauge (to Siliguri town and Siliguri junction) tracks. The Darjeeling Himalayan Railway narrow-gauge track was extended from Siliguri town station to the New Jaipaiguri station. The metre-gauge track from New Jaipaiguri to Siliguri town and Siliguri junction was later converted to broad gauge.

Amenities
New Jalpaiguri railway station has two double-bedded air-conditioned (AC) retiring rooms, six double-bedded non-AC retiring rooms, one three-bedded dormitory and one twelve-bedded dormitory. Free High speed Google RailWire WiFi is available at this station. It has IRCTC  and other private restaurants.

Services
New Jalpaiguri Jn, which is commonly called as NJP is the largest as well as busiest railway junction of North East Frontier Zone, which serves as the lifeline of the Northeastern states . NJP acts as a connecting base for the Northeastern states to the Indian mainland. NJP is the railway station of the largest city of North Bengal (Siliguri), which is popularly referred as the gateway of northeast India. New Jalpaiguri  railway station is amongst the top hundred booking stations of Indian Railway.

New Jalpaiguri is connected to almost all parts of the country (except Goa, Pune, Haridwar and Surat) and has been ranked 10th in the Cleanest Railway Stations of India recently. It has a good connection to Kolkata, Delhi and Guwahati and there are many other trains to different parts of India. New Jalpaiguri is the Busiest station in North Bengal and the Northeast Frontier Railway Zone. One International AC Train to Dhaka(Mitali Express), Premium - Howrah–New Jalpaiguri Vande Bharat Express,  Four Rajdhani Express, Two Vistadome Express, Two Humsafar Express, Four AC Superfast Express  and one Shatabdi Express (New Jalpaiguri–Howrah Shatabdi Express) runs from this station.

Darjeeling-Himalayan railway

There is one narrow-gauge platform at this station which operates trains towards Darjeeling hills as a part of Darjeeling Himalayan Railway. This is the last terminal of the DHR Railways.

India-Bangladesh rail link
This station have international express train service between India and Bangladesh. Mitali Express train operate from New Jalpaiguri railway station to Dhaka Cantonment railway station.
The Mitali Express train is an international express rail service which runs between the Indian city of Siliguri (New Jalpaiguri railway station) and the Bangladeshi capital Dhaka (Dhaka Cantonment railway station) every week.

Vistadome Specials
 New Jalpaiguri–Alipurduar Tourist Special originates from this station and passes through the beautiful Doars region of North Bengal.
 DHR Vistadome Special on Narrow Gauge also originates from this station and passes through hills of Darjeeling.

Connections

Buses 
The North Bengal State Transport Corporation operates bus services from NJP New Jalpaiguri Junction railway station to Siliguri city and sub urban areas, Also private buses runs between all over the city from NJP New Jalpaiguri Junction railway station

Cars 
Many road is directly connected from Siliguri to New Jalpaiguri Junction railway station.

Ride aggregator services Uber, Rapido, Ola provide rides from the train station to various parts of the city. One can also book private cabs to go Darjeeling, Gangtok and all over hill areas. Apart from these numerous private taxi operators provide pre-paid and post-paid taxi services to the city. E-rickshaw,  City auto facilities are available in the station.

See also 
 Siliguri Junction railway station
 Siliguri Town railway station

References

External links

 
 
 

Railway junction stations in West Bengal
Railway stations in Jalpaiguri district
Railway stations opened in 1961
Katihar railway division
Transport in Jalpaiguri
Indian Railway A1 Category Stations
1960 establishments in West Bengal
Transport in Siliguri